Davis station is a train station in Davis, California. The station is owned by the city, while the tracks are owned by the Union Pacific Railroad. The station is served by Amtrak California Zephyr, Capitol Corridor, and Coast Starlight trains. It is the primary stop for UC Davis.

History 

It was built by the California Pacific Railroad between August 24 and November 15, 1868, connecting Davis to Washington (now part of West Sacramento) to the east, Vallejo to the southwest, and Marysville to the northeast via a wye at Davis to Woodland, where the line separated to go northwest to Redding via Tehama and northeast to Marysville via a drawbridge at Knights Landing. In 1871 the Cal-P (as it later was called) was taken over by the Central Pacific Railroad; a fire later burned down the 19th century-style station. In 1914 the Central Pacific built a second depot in the Mission Revival style, which was remodeled in 1986. The depot was listed in the National Register of Historic Places in 1976.

References

External links 

Davis Amtrak Station (USA RailGuide -- TrainWeb)

Railway stations in Yolo County, California
Buildings and structures in Davis, California
Amtrak stations in California
Buildings and structures completed in 1914
National Register of Historic Places in Yolo County, California
Railway stations on the National Register of Historic Places in California
Railway stations in the United States opened in 1868
Railway stations in the United States opened in 1914
1868 establishments in California
1914 establishments in California
1910s architecture in the United States
Mission Revival architecture in California
Former Southern Pacific Railroad stations in California
Rail junctions in the United States